A conotoxin is one of a group of neurotoxic peptides isolated from the venom of the marine cone snail, genus Conus.

Conotoxins, which are peptides consisting of 10 to 30 amino acid residues, typically have one or more disulfide bonds.  Conotoxins have a variety of mechanisms of actions, most of which have not been determined.  However, it appears that many of these peptides modulate the activity of ion channels.
Over the last few decades conotoxins have been the subject of pharmacological interest.

The LD50 of conotoxin ranges from 5-25 μg/kg.

Hypervariability
Conotoxins are hypervariable even within the same species. They do not act within a body where they are produced (endogenously) but act on other organisms. Therefore, conotoxin genes experience less selection against mutations (like gene duplication and nonsynonymous substitution), and mutations remain in the genome longer, allowing more time for potentially beneficial novel functions to arise. Variability in conotoxin components reduces the likelihood that prey organisms will develop resistance; thus cone snails are under constant selective pressure to maintain polymorphism in these genes because failing to evolve and adapt will lead to extinction (Red Queen hypothesis).

Disulfide connectivities
Types of conotoxins also differ in the number and pattern of disulfide bonds. The disulfide bonding network, as well as specific amino acids in inter-cysteine loops, provide the specificity of conotoxins.

Types and biological activities
The number of conotoxins whose activities have been determined so far is five, and they are called the α(alpha)-, δ(delta)-, κ(kappa)-, μ(mu)-, and ω(omega)- types. Each of the five types of conotoxins attacks a different target:

 α-conotoxin inhibits nicotinic acetylcholine receptors at nerves and muscles.
 δ-conotoxin inhibits fast inactivation of voltage-dependent sodium channels.
 κ-conotoxin inhibits potassium channels.
 μ-conotoxin inhibits voltage-dependent sodium channels in muscles.
 ω-conotoxin inhibits N-type voltage-dependent calcium channels. Because N-type voltage-dependent calcium channels are related to algesia (sensitivity to pain) in the nervous system, ω-conotoxin has an analgesic effect: the effect of ω-conotoxin M VII A is 100 to 1000 times that of morphine.  Therefore, a synthetic version of ω-conotoxin M VII A has found application as an analgesic drug ziconotide (Prialt).

Alpha
Alpha conotoxins have two types of cysteine arrangements, and are competitive nicotinic acetylcholine receptor antagonists.

Delta, kappa, and omega 
Omega, delta and kappa families of conotoxins have a knottin or inhibitor cystine knot scaffold. The knottin scaffold is a very special disulfide-through-disulfide knot, in which the III-VI disulfide bond crosses the macrocycle formed by two other disulfide bonds (I-IV and II-V) and the interconnecting backbone segments, where I-VI indicates the six cysteine residues starting from the N-terminus. The cysteine arrangements are the same for omega, delta and kappa families, even though omega conotoxins are calcium channel blockers, whereas delta conotoxins delay the inactivation of sodium channels, and kappa conotoxins are potassium channel blockers.

Mu

Mu-conotoxins have two types of cysteine arrangements, but the knottin scaffold is not observed. Mu-conotoxins target the muscle-specific voltage-gated sodium channels, and are useful probes for investigating voltage-dependent sodium channels of excitable tissues. Mu-conotoxins target the voltage-gated sodium channels, preferentially those of skeletal muscle, and are useful probes for investigating voltage-dependent sodium channels of excitable tissues.

Different subtypes of voltage-gated sodium channels are found in different tissues in mammals, e.g., in muscle and brain, and studies have been carried out to determine the sensitivity and specificity of the mu-conotoxins for the different isoforms.

See also
 Conolidine
 Contryphan, members of "conotoxin O2"
 Conantokins, also known as "conotoxin B"

References

External links
 
 
 

Snail toxins
Ion channel toxins
Neurotoxins
Nicotinic antagonists
Peripheral membrane proteins